Mir Mujeeb-ur-Rehman Muhammad Hasani is a Pakistani politician who was a Member of the Provincial Assembly of Balochistan, from May 2013 to May 2018.

Early life and education
He was born on 12 November 1972 in Washuk District.

He has a degree in Master of Arts.

Political career

He was elected to the Provincial Assembly of Balochistan as a candidate of National Party from Constituency PB-47 Washuk in 2013 Pakistani general election.

References

Living people
Balochistan MPAs 2013–2018
1972 births